The Ireland national wheelchair rugby league team represents Ireland in wheelchair rugby league. They have competed at the World Cup, the European Championships, the Celtic Cup and Four Nations competitions.

History
In July 2012 Ireland took part their first international competition, the Four Nations, a round-robin tournament between England, Ireland, Scotland and Wales. The tournament was held as part of preparations for the world cup taking place the following year. At the 2013 World Cup Ireland lost their matches against Wales and England. A win against Scotland was not enough to progress to the semi-finals, but they defeated Scotland in a play-off to take fifth place. Ireland finished second at the 2014 Four Nations. In 2015 Ireland played Scotland in the first Celtic Cup which was contested over two matches but became an annual three-team round-robin with the addition of Wales in 2016. At the 2015 European Championships their only group stage win was against Wales, but with a play-off win over Scotland they took third place in the tournament. 
In 2016 Ireland were unable to travel with a full team for the Four Nations so their place was filled by a mixed team of Irish, Welsh and English players known as the Exiles. At the 2021 World Cup Ireland were not initially selected to take part but were brought in to replace Norway who had withdrawn from the tournament. Ireland were knocked out at the group stage after losses to Spain and Australia before suffering a record defeat (0–121) in their final match against England.

Squad

Competitive record

World Cup

Celtic Cup

Results

Records

Biggest win: 60–10 v. Scotland (14 September 2014)
Biggest defeat: 0–121 v. England (9 November 2022)

Honours
Celtic Cup: (2015)

Notes

References

Parasports in Ireland
Rugby league in Ireland
National wheelchair rugby league teams